Hassan Al-Otaibi (born on August 6, 1976) is a Saudi Arabian football goalkeeper. He was played .

In 2007, Al-Otaibi was loaned out to Al-Qadisiya, before joining Al-Hilal.

Statistics

Honours

International
Saudi Arabia
Islamic Solidarity Games: 2005

References
 Profile at Weltfussball

Living people
1976 births
Saudi Arabian footballers
Al-Dera'a FC players
Al Hilal SFC players
Al-Qadsiah FC players
Saudi Professional League players
Association football goalkeepers